The 2013 Faysal Bank Super Eight T20 Cup was the third season of the Faysal Bank Super Eight T20 Cup. It was played between March 26, 2013, and March 31, 2013, at the Gaddafi Stadium in Lahore. A total of 15 matches were played during the tournament.

Faisalabad Wolves were crowned the champions for the 2nd time. They beat the defending champions Sialkot Stallions in the final. Faisalabad Wolves won their first title in 2005. They participated in the 2013 Champions League Twenty20 as a result of winning the tournament.

Venue
All the matches were played at Gaddafi Stadium, Lahore.

Teams

Fixtures and results
All times shown are in Pakistan Standard Time (UTC+05).

Group stage

Group A
Points Table Source:Cricinfo

Group B
Points Table Source:Cricinfo

Knockout stage

Semi-finals

Final

References

External links
 Tournament site on ESPNcricinfo
 Tournament site on CricketArchive
 Tournament site on PCB official website

2013 in Pakistani cricket
Domestic cricket competitions in 2012–13
2013 Super 8 Twenty20 Cup
Pakistani cricket seasons from 2000–01